Hilton Alger is a hotel in Algiers, Algeria open in 1993, operated by Hilton Hotels.

History
The hôtel was built in the early 1990's as join-venture between Daewoo and the stade owned SAFEX. It openend in 1993 as a Hilton but it was closed less than one year later after the assassination of the Daewoo representative in Algeria.
It reopened in 1997 as Hotel International d'Alger and it become a second time a Hilton in 2000.

It closed in 2017 for renovations. The hotel contains 412 rooms, including 40 deluxe suites. It is served by the Sara restaurant which serves Mediterranean cuisine, the Casbah which serves traditional Algerian cuisine and Tamina, which serves Mediterranean and international cuisine. The hotel also has numerous bars and lounges.

References

External links
 Official Website

Hotels in Algiers
Hotels in Algeria
Alger
Hotel buildings completed in 1992